Theodard of Maastricht was a seventh-century bishop of Maastricht-Liège, in present-day Netherlands. As Theodard was murdered while on his way to protest the plundering of his diocese by Frankish nobles, he is considered a martyr. His feast day is 10 September. Theodard was uncle to his successor Lambert of Maastricht, and therefore brother or brother-in-law to Robert II, Lord Chancellor of France.

Sources
What little we know about Theodard comes from a seventh century biography, probably written by Heriger of Lobbes. There is also a later biography by Anselm of Liège.

Life
Theodard (known as also Diethardt or Dodart) is thought to have been a disciple of Remaclus at the monastery of Stavelot in Belgium. When Remaclus became bishop of Tongeren-Maastricht in around 653, Theodard succeeded him as abbot of the double monastery of Stavelot-Malmedy. When Remaclus retired to Stavelot in 663, Theodard succeeded him as bishop of Maastricht. His biographers describe him as a cheerful and likeable person who performed his role as bishop with great energy and pastoral care. As bishop, in 664 he presided over the dedication of Trudo's abbey (Saint-Trond) to St. Quentin and St. Remigius of Reims.

He was murdered, probably c.670, while on a journey through the forest of Bienwald near Speyer, on his way to seek justice from Childeric II of Austrasia in a legal dispute regarding Frankish nobles plundering the diocese. It is generally suspected that the murder was carried out on behalf of the nobles.

At first buried at the scene in Rülzheim, his body was later transferred to Liege by his nephew and successor, Lambert of Maastricht.

Veneration
Because he was murdered on his way to defend the rights of the Church, he was honored as a martyr.
A chapel was built at his place of death and original burial in Rülzheim, called the "Dieterskirchel". The place became an important pilgrimage site and is one of the oldest in the diocese of Speyer. Baronius added his name to Roman Martyrology when it was revised in the late 1500s. Theodard is venerated as the patron saint of drovers, cattle dealers and the city of Maastricht.

Dieterskirchel
The chapel was built on the eastern edge of a vast forest south of the town of Rülzheim, and attracted pilgrimages and processions from Rülzheim, Rheinzabern, and elsewhere. Anselm of Liège mentions a church built in honor of St. Theodard in the eleventh century. A larger church replaced it the fourteenth century but was subsequently demolished.

References

Sources
Paul Burns, Butler's Lives of the Saints, September (2000), pp. 90–1.

7th-century Frankish bishops
7th-century Christian saints
People from Maastricht